Night on Earth is a 1991 film directed by Jim Jarmusch.

Night on Earth may also refer to:

Night on Earth (TV series), a British nature documentary
Night on Earth (soundtrack), the soundtrack album from the Jarmusch film, written by Tom Waits
Night on Earth (Dawn of Relic album), a 2005 album by black metal band Dawn of Relic
A Night on Earth, an album by Crazy Penis

See also
 Last Night on Earth (disambiguation)